Akalaw is a village in Kyain Seikgyi Township, Kawkareik District, in the Kayin State of Myanmar. It is near the convergence of the Winyaw and Zami Rivers.

References

External links
 "Akalaw Map — Satellite Images of Akalaw" Maplandia World Gazetteer
 

 
Populated places in Kayin State